Welcome to the Wasteland may refer to:

 Welcome to the Wasteland (Logan album)
 Welcome to the Wasteland (Bad City album)